MAN Turbo AG was a company based in Oberhausen, Germany, that produced turbomachinery, including compressors, expanders, steam and gas turbines.  It was owned by the German conglomerate MAN SE.  In 2010, MAN Turbo and MAN Diesel were merged to form MAN Diesel & Turbo.

History
In 1954, BMW formed BMW Studienge-sellschaft für Triebwerkbau GmbH as part of West German efforts to resume aircraft engine production. The company was renamed BMW Triebwerkbau GmbH in 1957, and began producing  General Electric J79-11A turbojets for the Lockheed F-104G Starfighter program.

In 1960, MAN AG acquired 50 percent of BMW Triebwerkbau GmbH. MAN AG purchased the remainder of the company in 1965, and merged it with MAN Turbomotoren GmbH to form MAN Turbo GmbH.

In Autumn 1968, MAN Turbo and Daimler-Benz formed Entwicklungsgesellschaft für Turbomotoren GmbH (Motoren- und Turbinen-Union München GmbH from 1969) as a 50/50 joint venture, combining their aircraft engine development and manufacturing interests. MAN Turbo remained a separate company under MAN AG.

Products

Aeroengines
 MAN Turbo 6012
 MAN Turbo 6022
 Rolls-Royce/MAN Turbo RB153
 Rolls-Royce/MAN Turbo RB193
 Turbo-Union RB199

Gas turbines 
 51/60G, 35/44G, THM 3401, MGT6100, MGT6200 , other

References

External links
 MAN Diesel & Turbo Official Site

Gas turbine manufacturers
Aircraft engine manufacturers of Germany
MAN SE